The Buledi, Buledai, Baladi or Burdi are a western Baloch tribe of the Pakistanian provinces of Sindh and Balochistan.

History 
The Buledi divided the country amongst the Baloch tribes of Makran and declared their chief the head of the "Federation" with a title of Malik (which means "king" in Arabic) . Capt. E.C. Ross in his "Memorandum on Makran", published in 1868 mentioned the inscriptions on certain tombs in Kech valley of the Buledi rulers and especially Sheh Billar, who ruled Makran in 1729 A.D. The last ruler was Sheh Qasim (the nephew of Sheh Billar) who was killed by the Gichki chief, Malik Dinar.

Notable Personalities  
Shahnawaz Dahani, A international cricketer, Presently playing for Pakistan. He hails from the sub-tribe of Buledi which is Dahani.
Zahoor Ahmed Buledi

References

Baloch tribes